Sajmište is an urban neighborhood of the city of Novi Sad, Serbia.

Borders

The southern border of Sajmište is Futoška ulica (Futoška Street), the eastern border is Bulevar oslobođenja (Liberation Boulevard), the northern borders are Bulevar kralja Petra I (King Petar I Boulevard) and Ulica Braće Popović (Braće Popović Street), the north-western border is Ulica Branka Bajića (Branko Bajić Street), and the western border is a section of Subotički bulevar (Subotica Boulevard).

Neighbouring settlements
The neighbouring settlements are: Novo Naselje in the west, Detelinara in the north-west, Banatić in the north, Rotkvarija in the east, and Grbavica and Adamovićevo Naselje in the south.

Features
The important institutions located in Sajmište are: Provincial Hospital (Pokrajinska bolnica), Medical Faculty (Medicinski Fakultet) and Novi Sad Fair (Novosadski sajam).

Gallery

See also
 Neighborhoods of Novi Sad

References
Jovan Mirosavljević, Brevijar ulica Novog Sada 1745-2001, Novi Sad, 2002.
Zoran Rapajić, Novi Sad bez tajni, Beograd, 2002.

External links

 Detailed map of Novi Sad and Sajmište
 Map of Novi Sad

Novi Sad neighborhoods